Patricia Coats Jessamy is a former chief prosecutor for the City of Baltimore, Maryland. She was appointed to head the Office of the State's Attorney in 1995 and won reelection three times.

Background 
Born on July 26, 1948 in Hollandale, Mississippi Jessamy received a B.A. from Jackson State University in 1970 and graduated from the University of Mississippi School of Law in 1974. She was admitted to the Maryland Bar later that year.

Career 
Patricia Coats Jessamy was the first woman to serve as Baltimore City State’s Attorney. She may have pioneered the "do not call" list for police with integrity problems. She began her legal career in Maryland in 1985 as an Assistant State’s Attorney. In 1987, State’s Attorney Stuart Simms appointed Jessamy as Deputy State’s Attorney for Administration. As Deputy State’s Attorney, Jessamy created the Victim Assistance Program and was responsible for all fiscal matters, budgets, and personnel. In 1995, the Circuit Court unanimously appointed Jessamy as State’s Attorney following Simms' resignation to become State Secretary for Juvenile Services. She has successfully run for re-election in November 1998, 2002, and 2006. Jessamy considered running for Mayor of Baltimore during the 1999 mayoral election, but declined to run.

Jessamy was defeated in her September 14, 2010 primary bid by Democrat Gregg Bernstein.

Notes

References
|accessdate 18 September 2010.

1948 births
Living people
African-American lawyers
African-American people in Maryland politics
African-American women lawyers
American women lawyers
Jackson State University alumni
Maryland Democrats
People from Hollandale, Mississippi
State's attorneys in Maryland
University of Mississippi School of Law alumni
21st-century African-American people
21st-century African-American women
20th-century African-American people
20th-century African-American women